Lebanese Canadians are Canadians of Lebanese origin. According to the 2016 census there were 219,555 Canadians who claimed Lebanese ancestry, showing an increase compared to the 2006 census, making them by far the largest group of people with Arabic-speaking roots. As of the 2016 census, they are also one of the largest communities of Asian origin in the country.

History 

Lebanese immigration began in 1882. The first Lebanese immigrant to Canada was Abraham Bounadere (Ibrahim Abu Nadir) from Zahlé in Lebanon who settled in Montreal. Because of situations within Lebanon and restrictive Canadian laws these immigrants were 90% Christian. These immigrants were mostly economic migrants seeking greater prosperity in the New World.

In more recent years this pattern has changed, and large numbers of Lebanese Muslims and Druze have come to Canada. Immigration laws were liberalized after the Second World War, and immigration steadily increased in the 1950s and 1960s.

The greatest influx of Lebanese was during the Lebanese Civil War (1975-1990), and this period saw a number of Lebanon's wealthiest and best educated move to Canada to flee the violence in their homeland. Canada and Australia were the only Western countries to set up special programs to enable Lebanese to more easily emigrate. Canada set up an office in Cyprus to process Lebanese refugees.

The media has reported that as many as 50,000 of Lebanese-Canadians were in Lebanon during the summer of 2006, with about half of them permanently residing there.  During 2006 Lebanon War the large number of Canadians caught in the crossfire led to a major effort to evacuate them from the war zone. It also led some to accuse some of those holding Canadian citizenship of being Canadians of convenience.

Demography 

Many Lebanese speak French and prefer to settle in francophone Montreal rather than anglophone Toronto and Vancouver, British Columbia. About half of the Lebanese-Canadian community is located in and around Montreal, and most Lebanese-Canadian organizations, especially religious ones, are based in that city.

Lebanese Canadians account for a larger share of the population of Ottawa than that of any other census metropolitan area across the country, constituting over 2% of the total population of the National Capital Region. Canadians of Lebanese origin also made up more than 1% of the total populations of both Montreal and Halifax, while the figure was close to 1% in both Calgary and Edmonton. In Toronto, people of Lebanese origin made up less than half of one per cent of the total population. There are also substantial Lebanese populations in Vancouver, Windsor, London, Edmonton, Fredericton, and Charlottetown.

Prominent Canadians of Lebanese descent

See also

 Asian Canadians
 West Asian Canadians
 Canada–Lebanon relations

References

External links
 The Canadian Encyclopedia - Arabs
 Lebanese immigration to Montreal history (in French)

Arab Canadian
Asian Canadian
Ethnic groups in Canada
Canadian people of Lebanese descent
Lebanese Canadian
Canada
West Asian Canadians